David Verheyen (born 15 September 1981) is a Belgian professional road racing cyclist who currently races for UCI Professional Continental team Mitsubishi–Jartazi. He was born in Diest, and is the cousin of cyclist Geert Verheyen. He turned professional in 2006 having ridden the 2005 season as a trainee.

Palmarès

2004
3rd Stage 5, Tour de Namur, Florennes (BEL)

References

External links
 

1981 births
Living people
Belgian male cyclists
People from Diest
Cyclists from Flemish Brabant